The Nakanishi Prize, named after Japanese chemist Koji Nakanishi, is an award in chemistry given alternately by the Chemical Society of Japan and the American Chemical Society.

Purpose 
"To recognize and stimulate significant work that extends chemical and spectroscopic methods to the study of important biological phenomena."

History 
In 1995, friends and colleagues of Nakanishi established the Nakanishi Prize. It was decided that the Chemical Society of Japan and the American Chemical Society would alternate years awarding the prize. There are two separate endowments for the prize for each society, but the prize is the same for both awards: a medallion in presentation box, $5,000 prize money, and $2,500 travel reimbursements.

Recipients 
Source: American Chemical Society

See also
 List of chemistry awards

References

External links 
 Nakanishi Prize Homepage

Awards of the American Chemical Society
Chemical Society of Japan
Japanese science and technology awards